Minoa, or Minoea or Minoia or Minoida, was a town of ancient Greece on the island of Paros. 

Its site is unlocated on Paros.

References

Populated places in the ancient Aegean islands
Former populated places in Greece
Paros
Lost ancient cities and towns